Reflection is the sixth studio album by Japanese producer tofubeats, released on May 18, 2022 through Warner Music Japan subsidiary unBORDE. The album is his fifth on a major label. It peaked at 14 on the Japanese Oricon charts.

Release 
The album was released on May 18, 2022 in Japan. The album has several features, including rap group , and singer Kaho Nakamura. The album was released with an accompanying book that details the artist's struggles with temporary hearing loss. A remix album, titled REFLECTION REMIXES, was released on November 3, 2022, and features remixes from artists such as Towa Tei.

Track listing

Chart positions

References 

2022 albums
Japanese-language albums
Tofubeats albums
Unborde albums